The Grammy Award for Best Classical Performance - Instrumental Soloist or Soloists (with or without orchestra)  was awarded from 1967 to 1971 and in 1987.  Outside of these years the award has been divided into the Grammy Award for Best Instrumental Soloist(s) Performance (with orchestra) and the Grammy Award for Best Instrumental Soloist Performance (without orchestra).

Years reflect the year in which the Grammy Awards were presented, for works released in the previous year.

Recipients

Nominees of the 9th Grammy Awards (1967) included Julian Bream for Baroque Guitar, pianist John Browning for Prokofiev: Concert No. 1 in D Flat Major for Piano; Concerto No. 2 in G Minor for Piano (conducted by Erich Leinsdorf with the Boston Symphony Orchestra), pianist Raymond Lewenthal for Operatic Liszt, violinist Yehudi Menuhin for Elgar: Concerto for Violin, Ivan Moravec for Chopin: Nocturnes, Arthur Rubinstein for Rubinstein and Chopin (featuring Frédéric Chopin's Bolero, Tarantelle, Fantaisie in F minor and Trois nouvelles études), violinist Isaac Stern for Dvořák: Concerto in A Minor for Violin (conducted by Eugene Ormandy with the Philadelphia Orchestra), and Australian classical guitarist John Williams for Rodrigo: Concierto de Aranjuez for Guitar and Orchestra/Castelnuovo-Tedesco: Concerto in D Major for Guitar (conducted by Ormandy and the Philadelphia Orchestra). Bream received the award for Baroque Guitar, which featured pieces by Johann Sebastian Bach, Gaspar Sanz, Silvius Leopold Weiss and other composers.

References

Grammy Awards for classical music